Jaclyn DeSantis is an American actress. She is best known for playing Maggie on the NBC television series Windfall.

Early life
Jaclyn was born in Long Island, New York. 
She attended the School of Visual Arts in Manhattan and Mass Arts in Boston. Later, she went on to study at the Lee Strasberg Theatre and Film Institute.
Dividing her time between New York City and Los Angeles, Jaclyn enjoys performing as a musician and travelling to Spain, the United Kingdom, Germany and France.

Career
DeSantis played Heather in Road Trip and Alexandra in Bomb the System in 2002.

In 2005 she played Leticia in the crime/drama movie Carlito's Way: Rise to Power. DeSantis appeared as a young widow and rancher in the 2008 film A Gunfighter's Pledge. In 2009 she played Cuba Gooding Jr.'s wife in the film, The Way of War.

In 2003 she portrayed Luis Guzman's daughter on the sitcom, Luis.

Since 2014 she has been working as a Wildlife Rehabilitator and Educator at the Ojai Raptor Center in Southern California.

Other activities
Jaclyn is also an international DJ with the group Gaia Tribe.
Her hobbies include painting, writing, photography, dancing and yoga.

Filmography

Film

Television

References

External links

American television actresses
Actresses from New York (state)
Living people
1979 births
21st-century American women